Laurdal may refer to:

Laurdal, an old name for Lardal municipality, Vestfold county, Norway
Laurdal, an old name for the now-defunct Lårdal municipality, Telemark county, Norway